James Hoban  (1755 – December 8, 1831) was an Irish-American architect, best known for designing the White House.

Life

James Hoban was a Roman Catholic raised on Desart Court estate belonging to the Earl of Desart near Callan, County Kilkenny, Ireland. He worked there as a wheelwright and carpenter until his early twenties, when he was given an 'advanced student' place in the Dublin Society's Drawing School on Lower Grafton Street, Dublin. He studied under Thomas Ivory. He excelled in his studies and received the prestigious Duke of Leinster's medal for drawings of "Brackets, Stairs, and Roofs" from the Dublin Society in 1780. Hoban was an apprentice to Ivory, from 1779 to 1785.

Following the American Revolutionary War, Hoban emigrated to the United States, and established himself as an architect in Philadelphia in 1785.

Hoban was in South Carolina by April 1787, where he designed numerous buildings including the Charleston County Courthouse (1790–92), built on the ruins of the former South Carolina Statehouse (1753, burned 1788). President George Washington admired Hoban's work on his Southern Tour, Washington may have met with him in Charleston in May 1791, and summoned the architect to Philadelphia, Pennsylvania (the temporary national capital) in June 1792.

In July 1792, Hoban was named winner of the design competition for the White House. His initial design seems to have had a 3-story facade, nine bays across (like the Charleston courthouse). Under Washington's influence, Hoban amended this to a 2-story facade, 11 bays across, and, at Washington's insistence, the whole presidential mansion was faced with stone. It is unclear whether any of Hoban's surviving drawings are actually from the competition.

It is known that Hoban owned at least three slaves who were employed as carpenters in the construction of the White House.  Their names are recorded as "Ben, Daniel, and Peter" and appear in a James Hoban slave payroll.

Hoban was also one of the supervising architects who worked on the Capitol, carrying out the design of Dr. William Thornton, as well as with The Octagon House. 
Hoban lived the rest of his life in Washington, D.C., where he worked on other public buildings and government projects, including roads and bridges.

Hoban was a Freemason.

Local folklore has it that Hoban designed Rossenarra House near the village of Kilmoganny in County Kilkenny, Ireland in 1824.

Hoban's wife, Susanna "Susan" Sewall, was the sister of the prominent Georgetown City Tavern proprietor, Clement Sewall, who enlisted as a sergeant at age 19 in the Maryland Line during the Revolutionary War, was promoted six months later to ensign and then severely wounded at the Battle of Germantown.

After the District of Columbia was granted limited home rule in 1802, Hoban served on the twelve-member city council for most of the remainder of his life, except during the years he was rebuilding the White House. Hoban was also involved in the development of Catholic institutions in the city, including Georgetown University (where his son was a member of the Jesuit community), St. Patrick's Parish, and the Georgetown Visitation Monastery founded by another Kilkenny native, Teresa Lalor of Ballyragget.

Hoban died in Washington, D.C., on December 8, 1831. He was originally buried at Holmead's Burying Ground, but was disinterred and reburied at Mount Olivet Cemetery in Washington, D.C. His son James Hoban, Jr., said to closely resemble his father, served as district attorney of the District of Columbia.

Work
Little has been published to catalogue Hoban's architectural work.

 Charleston County Courthouse, 82-86 Broad Street, Charleston, SC (1790–92). Both this building and the White House were modeled on Leinster House, the current Irish Parliament Building, that in the 18th century was the home of the Gaelic Norman Fitzgerald Family, Earls of Kildare.
 The White House, 1600 Pennsylvania Avenue, Washington, D.C. – (1792–1800). Following the 1814 burning of the White House, Hoban rebuilt the Southern Portico for President James Monroe (1824), and the Northern Portico for President Andrew Jackson (1829).
The Octagon House, 1799 New York Ave, Washington DC (1802)

Attributed buildings
 "Prospect Hill" (Ephraim Baynard mansion), Prospect Hill Plantation, 2695 Laurel Hill Road, Edisto Island, SC 29438 – circa 1790. (Attributed to Hoban.)
 First Bank of the United States, Third Street, between Chestnut and Walnut Streets, Philadelphia, PA – 1795. (Samuel Blodgett is the credited designer, but some attribute it to James Hoban.)
 McCleery House, 1068 Thirtieth St. NW, Georgetown, Washington, DC, c. 1800. (With many fine significant interior details, reportedly designed by James Hoban.)
 The William John Edward House, Edisto Island, SC – completed 1810. (Attributed to Hoban.)
 "Baum-Taft House (Taft Museum of Art), 316 Pike Street, Cincinnati, OH – 1820. (Attributed to Hoban.)
 Oak Hill (James Monroe House) (President James Monroe mansion), in Aldie, Virginia – 1820. (Monroe sought the advice of both Hoban and Thomas Jefferson on the design of his mansion.)
 Rossenarra House, near the village of Kilmaganny, Ireland – 1824. (Attributed to Hoban).
 Belcamp House – Belcamp College, Malahide road, Dublin 17,  Built complete with "oval office" . The college was established around it in 1893 as a juniorate for the Oblate Fathers, It was built onto the original house but the house still stands intact today.

Demolished buildings
 Blodget's Union Public Hotel (a.k.a. Blodget's Lottery Hotel), site of the first General Post Office of the United States, northeast corner of 8th and E Streets, Washington, D.C. – 1783 (Demolished in 1856)
 Wye Hall (John Paca mansion), Wye Island directly opposite Wye Plantation, Maryland – circa 1787 (Demolished 1789)
 South Carolina State House, Columbia, S.C. – 1790 (burned 1865)
 The Charleston Theatre, New and Broad Streets, Charleston, S.C. – 1792 (Demolished)
 Northeast Executive Building, Fifteenth Street, near The White House (Demolished)
 Market House (a.k.a. "Marsh Market"), Pennsylvania Avenue and Seventh Street, Washington, D.C. – 1801 (Demolished)
 St.  Patrick's Church, Corner of 14th and H Streets, NW, Washington, D.C. (Demolished. Now the site of the old Grand Lodge building)
 St Mary's Chapel (a.k.a. Barry's Chapel), Roman Catholic parish church, 10th and F Streets, Washington, D.C. – 1806 (Demolished; its cornerstone was saved, and is now inserted in the outer wall of the Holy Name Chapel, the Church of St. Dominic.)

Commemorations
Numerous events were held around 2008 to commemorate the 250th anniversary of his birth.

In 2008, a memorial arbor to honor James Hoban was completed near his birthplace, and a major exhibition on his life took place at the White House Visitor Center.

Dublin Made Him..., a one-day colloquium in honour of Hoban, took place on October 3, 2008, at the (RDS) in Dublin, Ireland. It was presented by the RDS in association with the White House Historical Association, the U.S. Embassy in Ireland, and the James Hoban Societies of the U.S. and Ireland.

The Irish-American musical group Solas have a song "John Riordan's Heels/The Bath Jig/Hoban's White House" on their album For Love and Laughter. Group member Mick McAuley, like Hoban, is from Kilkenny, and named the song in Hoban's honor.

See also
John Henry Devereux South Carolina architect
List of people on stamps of Ireland
White House
 Pedro Casanave

References

Bibliography

Further reading

External links

1758 births
1831 deaths
18th-century American architects
American Freemasons
Federalist architects
Irish architects
Irish emigrants to the United States (before 1923)
People from Callan, County Kilkenny
Burials at Mount Olivet Cemetery (Washington, D.C.)
Burials at Holmead's Burying Ground
American slave owners
19th-century American architects
Irish Freemasons
Irish slave owners